Moulson is a surname and may refer to:

Con Moulson (1906–1989), Irish footballer and manager
George Moulson (1914–1994), Irish professional football player
Matt Moulson (born 1983), Canadian professional ice hockey left winger
Robert Moulson (1932–2003), American classical tenor
Roger Moulson, English poet whose debut volume Waiting for the Night-Rowers won the Jerwood Aldeburgh First Collection Prize
Thomas Moulson (1582–1638), alderman, member of the Grocers' Company, Sheriff of London in 1624 and Lord Mayor of London in 1634

See also
Moulon (disambiguation)
Olson (disambiguation)
Oulon